The Nanov is a right tributary of the river Vedea in Romania. It discharges into the Vedea in Calomfirești, south of the city Alexandria.

References

Rivers of Romania
Rivers of Teleorman County